Theodoxus is a genus of nerites, small water snails with an operculum, some of which live in freshwater, and some in both freshwater and brackish water, aquatic gastropod mollusks in the family Neritidae, the nerites.

Distribution 
The distribution of the genus Theodoxus includes Europe and northern Africa and also extends east to southern Iran. No other species within Neritidae have sympatrical distribution with Theodoxus. The distribution of the genus Theodoxus is an exception within Neritidae, because Neritidae live primarily in the southern hemisphere. Species within Theodoxus are the only Neritidae snails, that live in temperate climate.

Bunje & Lindberg (2007) presented the first phylogenetic hypothesis of the clade Theodoxus. The evolution of the genus Theodoxus was affected by separating of Mediterranean Sea and Paratethys sea in Miocene.

Description 

The shell in this genus is semiovular with a flat apertural plain. There is no umbilicus. The columella and inner whorls are dissolved.

Species in the genus Theodoxus  are highly variable in size, in color pattern of the periostracum, in details of the operculum and in the radula, and all these factors can make identification to species level very challenging.

Ecology 
These animals live on stones, and often also under stones, in up to 5–6 m depth or deeper, feeding on algal covers. Theodoxus  needs rough surfaces in order to be able to digest its food, so a stony substrate is necessary. Green algae  are not consumed; Theodoxus  has no cellulases. These snails lay egg capsules containing 30-70 eggs each, usually on the shells of other Theodoxus  animals; only one juvenile grows, the other eggs serve as food.

Species 
There were no systematic review of the genus Theodoxus as of 2007. Bunje (2004) noted at least 34 extant taxa at species level in the genus Theodoxus. IUCN Red List (2015) provided conservation status for 23 species of Theodoxus.

Species within the genus Theodoxus include:
 Subgenus Brusinaella Andrusov, 1912
 † Theodoxus petasatus (Seninski, 1905) 
 Subgenus Calvertia Bourguignat, 1880

 † Theodoxus acuticarinatus (Fuchs, 1870) 
 † Theodoxus amblygonioides Wenz, 1930 
 † Theodoxus amethystinus (Brusina, 1874)
 † Theodoxus anconae (Capellini, 1880)
 † Theodoxus angularis Gozhik, 2002 
 † Theodoxus anonymus Anistratenko & Gozhik, 1995 
 † Theodoxus atticus Kühn, 1963
 † Theodoxus barakovici (Brusina, 1902)
 † Theodoxus bessarabicus (Sinzov, 1896)
 † Theodoxus brusinai (Pavlović, 1931)
 † Theodoxus capellinii (Pantanelli, 1876)
 † Theodoxus capillaceus (Brusina, 1874)
 † Theodoxus crescens (Fuchs, 1870)
 † Theodoxus doderleini (d'Ancona, 1869)
 † Theodoxus dumortieri (Fontannes, 1878)
 † Theodoxus fasciatus Gozhik in Gozhik & Datsenko, 2007 
 † Theodoxus gnezdai (Brusina, 1884)
 † Theodoxus grateloupianus (Férussac, 1823)
 † Theodoxus hoernesanus (Semper, 1867)
 † Theodoxus ingulenzis Gozhik in Gozhik & Datsenko, 2007 
 † Theodoxus kalodictya (Andrusov, 1909)
 † Theodoxus koslinskyi (Porumbaru, 1881)
 † Theodoxus lamellatus (Brusina, 1892)
 † Theodoxus lineatus (Sinzov, 1896)
 † Theodoxus lorkovici (Brusina, 1878)
 † Theodoxus macedonicus Wenz, 1943 
 † Theodoxus maculosus Gozhik in Gozhik & Datsenko, 2007 
 † Theodoxus mayeri (Semper, 1867)
 † Theodoxus militaris (Neumayr, 1869)
 † Theodoxus miljkovici (Brusina, 1902)
 † Theodoxus millepunctatus (Brusina, 1902)
 † Theodoxus moeschi Locard, 1893 
 † Theodoxus morulus Kühn, 1963 
 † Theodoxus mutinensis (d'Ancona, 1869)
 † Theodoxus neumayri (Burgerstein, 1877)
 † Theodoxus nitens Gozhik, 2002 
 † Theodoxus nivosus (Brusina, 1874)
 † Theodoxus novorossicus (Sinzov, 1896)
 † Theodoxus obtusangulaeformis Gozhik, 2002 
 † Theodoxus oxytropida (Andrusov, 1909)
 † Theodoxus pavlovici Milošević, 1983 
 † Theodoxus philippianus Locard, 1883 
 † Theodoxus pilari (Brusina, 1884)
 † Theodoxus platystoma (Brusina, 1874)
 † Theodoxus pseudodanubialis (Sinzov, 1896)
 † Theodoxus pseudofluviatilis Locard, 1893 
 † Theodoxus pseudograteloupanus (Sinzov, 1884)
 † Theodoxus radmanesti (Fuchs, 1870)
 † Theodoxus radovanovici (Brusina, 1893)
 † Theodoxus reiseri (Brusina, 1902)
 † Theodoxus rugosus (Pavlović, 1931)
 † Theodoxus sagittiferus (Brusina, 1874)
 † Theodoxus schachmaticus (Andrusov, 1909)
 † Theodoxus scoliogramma (Brusina, 1884)
 † Theodoxus semidentatus (Sandberger, 1875)
 † Theodoxus serrulatus (Brusina, 1892)
 † Theodoxus slavonicus (Brusina, 1878)
 † Theodoxus sophievkaensis Gozhik in Gozhik & Datsenko, 2007 
 † Theodoxus stanae (Brusina, 1893)
 † Theodoxus stefanescui (Fontannes, 1887)
 † Theodoxus stefanescuiformis Gozhik in Gozhik & Datsenko, 2007 
 † Theodoxus subquadrofasciatus Gozhik, 2002 
 † Theodoxus subslavonicus Gozhik, 2002 
 † Theodoxus sundicus (Andrusov, 1909)
 † Theodoxus suskalovici (Pavlović, 1903)
 † Theodoxus sycophantus (Brusina, 1878)
 † Theodoxus tropidophorus (Brusina, 1884)
 † Theodoxus turbinatus (Fuchs, 1870)
 † Theodoxus veljetinensis (Pavlović, 1903)
 † Theodoxus venustus (Brusina, 1897)
 † Theodoxus xanthozona (Brusina, 1884)
 † Theodoxus zagradovkaensis Gozhik, 2002 
 † Theodoxus zivkovici (Pavlović, 1903) 

Subgenus Neritonyx Andrusov, 1912	
 † Theodoxus unguiculatus (Seninski, 1905)

Subgenus Ninniopsis Tomlin, 1930
 † Theodoxus colchicus (Andrusov, 1912)

Subgenus Neritaea Roth, 1855
 Theodoxus anatolicus (Récluz, 1841)
 † Theodoxus groyanus (Férussac, 1823) 
 Theodoxus jordani (Sowerby)
 † Theodoxus micans (Gaudry & Fischer in Gaudry, 1867) 
 Theodoxus niloticus (Reeve, 1856) - synonym: Theodoxus africanus (Reeve, 1856)
 † Theodoxus subdoricus Schütt, 1976 
 Theodoxus subterrelictus Schütt, 1963
 Theodoxus peloponensis (Récluz, 1841)
 Theodoxus varius (Menke, 1828)

Subgenus Theodoxus Montfort, 1810

 Theodoxus altenai Schütt, 1965
 Theodoxus baeticus (Lamarck, 1822)
 † Theodoxus becenensis (Cobălcescu, 1883) 
 † Theodoxus brenneri (Handmann, 1882) 
 † Theodoxus carasiensis Jekelius, 1944 
 † Theodoxus constantiae Stefanescu, 1896 
 † Theodoxus culceri (Porumbaru, 1881) 
 † Theodoxus cyrtocelis (Krauss, 1852) 
 Theodoxus danubialis 	(Pfeiffer, 1828)
 † Theodoxus denisluensis (Oppenheim, 1919) 
 † Theodoxus deperditus (Almera, 1894) 
 † Theodoxus elongatulus (Philippi, 1844) 
 † Theodoxus eugenii Jekelius, 1944 
 Theodoxus euxinus (Clessin, 1886)
 Theodoxus fluviatilis (Linnaeus, 1758) - type species. synonyms: Theodoxus brauneri (Lindholm, 1908) (but as separate species per); Theodoxus brauneri f. lacrymans Lindholm, 1908; Theodoxus brauneri f.  alboguttata Lindholm, 1908; Theodoxus brauneri f. pulherrima Lindholm, 1908; Theodoxus lutetianus Montfort, 1810. Bunje (2005) does not consider Theodoxus velox Anistratenko, 1999 to be a distinct species from Theodoxus fluviatilis.
 † Theodoxus gregarius (Thomä, 1845) 
 Theodoxus heldreichi (Martens, 1879)
 † Theodoxus hisingeri (Bellardi & Michelotti, 1841) 
 Theodoxus hispalensis (Martens, 1879)
 † Theodoxus jekeliusi Jurišić-Polšak, 1979 
 † Theodoxus leobersdorfensis (Handmann, 1887) 
 Theodoxus meridionalis (Philippi, 1836)
 † Theodoxus milessii Papp, 1979 
 † Theodoxus moosbrunnensis Papp, 1953 
 † Theodoxus morellii (Bellardi & Michelotti, 1841) 
 Theodoxus pallasi Lindholm, 1924 - synonym: Theodoxus lituratus (Eichwald, 1838)
 † Theodoxus pilidei (Tournouër, 1879) 
 Theodoxus prevostianus (Pfeiffer, 1828)
 † Theodoxus punctatolineatus (Sinzov, 1896) 
 Theodoxus saulcyi (Bourguignat, 1852)
 † Theodoxus scamandrius (Calvert & Neumayr, 1880) 
 † Theodoxus semiplicatus (Neumayr in Herbich & Neumayr, 1875) 
 † Theodoxus simplex (Fuchs, 1877) 
 † Theodoxus subglobosus (Eichwald, 1853) 
 Theodoxus subthermalis (Bourguignat in Issel, 1865) or Theodoxus fluviatilis subthermalis Issel, 1865
 Theodoxus transversalis (Pfeiffer, 1828)
 † Theodoxus trifasciatus (Grateloup, 1839) 
 † Theodoxus turislavicus Jekelius, 1944 
 Theodoxus valentinus (Graells, 1846)
 † Theodoxus zografi (Brusina, 1902) 

Subgenus ?

 † Theodoxus abnormis (Jenkins, 1864) 
 † Theodoxus almelae (Revilla, 1958) 
 Theodoxus astrachanicus Starobogatov, 1994
 † Theodoxus banaticus Jekelius, 1944 
 † Theodoxus bohotinensis (Simionescu & Barbu, 1940) 
 † Theodoxus bolivari (Royo Gómez, 1922) 
 † Theodoxus bukowskii (Oppenheim, 1919) 
 Theodoxus cariosus (Wood, 1828)
 Theodoxus coronatus (Leach, 1815)
 † Theodoxus crenulatus (Klein, 1853) 
 † Theodoxus cunici (Brusina, 1892) 
 Theodoxus danasteri (Lindholm, 1908)
  † Theodoxus doricus (Neumayr, 1880)
 Theodoxus euxinus (Clessin, 1886)
 Theodoxus gloeri Odabaşi & Arslan, 2015
 Theodoxus gurur Sands & Glöer, 2020
 † Theodoxus hellenicus (Bukowski, 1896) 
 † Theodoxus imbricatus (Brusina, 1878) 
 † Theodoxus intracarpaticus Jekelius, 1944 
 Theodoxus karasuna
  † Theodoxus licherdopoli (Stefanescu, 1896)
 Theodoxus luteofasciatus (Miller, 1879)
 Theodoxus macri (Sowerby, 1849)
 Theodoxus maresi (Bourguignat, 1864)
 Theodoxus marteli (Pallary, 1920)
 Theodoxus milachevitchi Golikov & Starobogatov, 1966
 Theodoxus mutinensis
 Theodoxus numidicus (Récluz, 1841)
 Theodoxus olivaceus
 Theodoxus pallasi Lindholm, 1924
  Theodoxus pallidus Dunker, 1861
 † Theodoxus pappi Sauerzopf, 1952 
 † Theodoxus paradisii (Magrograssi, 1928) 
 † Theodoxus patrae Esu & Girotti, 2015 
 † Theodoxus percarinatus (Oppenheim, 1919) 
 Theodoxus pilidei (Tournouêr, 1879)
 † Theodoxus politioanei Jekelius, 1944 
 † Theodoxus politus Jekelius, 1944 
 Theodoxus poppei Ahuir, 2020
 † Theodoxus postcrenulatus Papp, 1953 
 † Theodoxus prozlatarici Jekelius, 1944 
 † Theodoxus pseudodacicus Neubauer, Harzhauser, Georgopoulou, Mandic & Kroh, 2014 †
 † Theodoxus quadrifasciatus (Bielz, 1864) †

 † Theodoxus reticulatus Pană, 1990 

 † Theodoxus rhodiensis (Tournouër in Fischer, 1877) 
 Theodoxus sarmaticus (Lindholm, 1901)
 Theodoxus schultzii (Grimm, 1877)
 † Theodoxus scriptus (Stefanescu, 1896) 
 † Theodoxus serratiliniformis Geyer, 1914
 † Theodoxus sinjanus (Brusina, 1876) 
 † Theodoxus soceni Jekelius, 1944 
 † Theodoxus sphaeroidalis (Revilla, 1958) 
 † Theodoxus spratti (Jenkins, 1864)
 † Theodoxus stoicai Neubauer, Harzhauser, Georgopoulou, Mandic & Kroh, 2014 
 Theodoxus subthermalis Bourguignat in Issel, 1865
 † Theodoxus susuzianus Harzhauser, Neubauer & Hoşgör, 2018 
 † Theodoxus timisensis Jekelius, 1944 
 † Theodoxus trilophosensis Rust, 1997 
 Theodoxus velascoi (Graëlls, 1846)
 Theodoxus velox V. Anistratenko in O. Anistratenko, Starobogatov & V. Anistratenko, 1999
 Theodoxus vespertinus (Sowerby II, 1849)
 Theodoxus wesselinghi Sands & Glöer, 2020
 Theodoxus wilkei Sands & Glöer, 2020
 † Theodoxus zlatarici Brusina, 1902) 

Synonyms
 † Theodoxus burdigalensis (d'Orbigny, 1852) : synonym of †  Theodoxus (Theodoxus) trifasciatus (Grateloup, 1839) 
 Theodoxus cariosus (Wood, 1828) and Theodoxus cariosa are synonyms of Neritina cariosa (Wood, 1828)
 † Theodoxus dacicus Jekelius, 1944: synonym of † Theodoxus (Theodoxus) leobersdorfensis dacicus Jekelius, 1944 
 Theodoxus doriae Issel, 1865: synonym of  Theodoxus fluviatilis (Linnaeus, 1758) represented as Theodoxus (Theodoxus) fluviatilis (Linnaeus, 1758)
 Theodoxus euphraticus (Mousson, 1874) is a synonym of Neritina euphratica Mousson, 1874
 † Theodoxus intracarpatica Jekelius, 1944 : synonym of  † Theodoxus intracarpaticus Jekelius, 1944 
 Theodoxus lutetianus Montfort, 1810: synonym of Theodoxus fluviatilis (Linnaeus, 1758) represented as Theodoxus (Theodoxus) fluviatilis (Linnaeus, 1758)
 † Theodoxus mariae (Handmann, 1887): synonym of † Neritina mariae Handmann, 1887 
 † Theodoxus martensi (Brusina, 1884): synonym of † Ninnia martensi (Brusina, 1884)
 Theodoxus neglectus is a synonym of Neritina neglecta (Pease, 1861)
 † Theodoxus oslavanensis Rzehak, 1893: synonym of † Theodoxus (Theodoxus) cyrtocelis austriacus (Rzehak, 1893) 
 Theodoxus oualaniense (Lesson, 1831): synonym of  Checked: verified by a taxonomic editorClithon oualaniense (Lesson, 1831)
 † Theodoxus perlongus Jekelius, 1944: synonym of † Theodoxus (Theodoxus) zografi perlongus Jekelius, 1944 
 † Theodoxus petralbensis Jekelius, 1944: synonym of † Theodoxus (Theodoxus) zografi petralbensis Jekelius, 1944 
 † Theodoxus pictus (Férussac, 1823): synonym of † Agapilia picta (Férussac, 1823) 
 Theodoxus reclivatus Say, 1822: synonym of  Neritina usnea (Röding, 1798)
 † Theodoxus rumanus (Stefanescu, 1896): synonym of † Theodoxus (Calvertia) stefanescui (Fontannes, 1887) 
 † Theodoxus scamandri (Calvert & Neumayr, 1880):  synonym of † Theodoxus (Theodoxus) scamandrius (Calvert & Neumayr, 1880) 
 Theodoxus vespertinus : synonym of Neritina vespertinus (Sowerby, 1849)
 † Theodoxus vetranici (Brusina, 1902): synonym of † Neritina vetranici (Brusina, 1902) 
 Theodoxus virginea (Linnaeus, 1758): synonym of Neritina virginea (Linnaeus, 1758)
 † Theodoxus (Vittoclithon) pictus bizonalis (Grateloup, 1839): synonym of † Agapilia picta bizonalis (Grateloup, 1839)

References 
This article incorporates public domain text from the reference 

 Eichhorst T.E. (2016). Neritidae of the world. Volume 2. Harxheim: Conchbooks. Pp. 696-1366

External links 

 Bandel K. (2001). "The history of Theodoxus  and Neritina connected with description and systematic evaluation of related Neritimorpha (Gastropoda)". Mittelungen aus dem Geologisch-Palaontologischen Institut Universitat Hamburg 85: 65-164. abstract.

Neritidae
Gastropod genera
Taxonomy articles created by Polbot